Rivière-des-Prairies station is a commuter rail station operated by Exo in the borough of Rivière-des-Prairies–Pointe-aux-Trembles, in Montreal, Quebec, Canada. It is served by the Mascouche line. 

The station is located parallel to Boulevard Maurice-Duplessis at the corner of Rue Saint-Jean-Baptiste in Rivière-des-Prairies. Two tracks run through the station, but only one is served by the station's single low-level side platform on the north side of the tracks. There is no station building, with the platform exiting directly onto the sidewalk. The station is wheelchair accessible. The station's parking lot and bus loop are located across Boulevard Maurice-Duplessis from the station.

A sculpture by Gilles Mihalcean entitled J'arrive is located in the parking lot.

Connecting bus routes

Société de transport de Montréal (STM)

References

External links
 Rivière-des-Prairies Commuter Train Station Information (RTM)
 Rivière-des-Prairies Commuter Train Station Schedule (RTM)
 2016 STM System Map

Exo commuter rail stations
Rivière-des-Prairies–Pointe-aux-Trembles
Railway stations in Quebec